Hong Kong UNESCO Global Geopark, formerly Hong Kong National Geopark (香港國家地質公園), was inaugurated on 3 November 2009. It is a single entity of land area over 150 km2 across parts of the eastern and northeastern New Territories. On 18 September 2011, UNESCO listed the geopark as part of its Global Geoparks Network.

The Hong Kong UNESCO Global Geopark consists of two geological regions:
 the Sai Kung Volcanic Rock Region, with its widely distributed tuff volcanic rocks displaying prismatic columnar jointing, which are of international geological significance
 the Northeast New Territories Sedimentary Rock Region, which comprises sedimentary rocks formed in different geologic periods, showcasing the complete geological history of Hong Kong.

History
In 2008, the Hong Kong government commissioned a study to investigate the feasibility of establishing a geopark. The study identified two suitable regions, namely the north-eastern New Territories and Sai Kung. The government subsequently set up a geopark to cover both regions. The geopark was formally inaugurated by Chief Executive Donald Tsang on 3 November 2009.

Sai Kung Volcanic Rock Region

High Island
High Island is the home of the columnar-jointed volcanic tuff. Most of the columns are sub-vertical, straight-sided and parallel. It covers a large area around Sai Kung Peninsula in the eastern part of Hong Kong, including High Island Reservoir and Tai Long Wan.

Ung Kong Group
Ung Kong Island Group is located in southeastern Hong Kong, immediately to the south of the High Island peninsula and to the northwest of the Ninepin group of islands. It consists of Wang Chau, Basalt Island and Bluff Island. Columnar-jointed rocks underlie these islands, giving their cliff coastline a distinctive appearance, and leading to the development of many sea caves and sea arches.

Ninepin Group
Ninepin Group is located on the eastern side of Hong Kong, forms a series of offshore islands. Numerous inclined columnar jointed volcanic rocks create cliffs and coastal scenery around the Ninepin Group. Columns in the Ninepin Group are as large as 3-meters in diameter.

Sharp Island
Sharp Island is located in the Port Shelter, to the southeast of the Sai Kung Town, from where it can easily be reached by small boat. The island is underlain by older volcanic-related sedimentary rocks. There is a tombolo reaching to a small island nearby at low tide.

Northeast New Territories Sedimentary Rock Region

Double Haven and Port Island
Double Haven or Yan Chau Tong is a harbour hugged by Double Island, Crescent Island and Crooked Island with north-eastern New Territories. It contains many deep red coloured rocks formed during a period of global warming in Tertiary. Oxidation rate of iron increased due to higher temperature and humidity, forming the iron oxide (rust)

Port Island, as the Chinese name Chek Chau implies, Port Island is a place of red earth. The ground on the entire island is rust-coloured conglomerate and siltstone formed similarly during Teritary.

North and south coasts of Tolo Channel 
The area includes the north and south shores of Tolo Channel. The oldest rocks in Hong Kong, the Bluff Head formation, formed about 400 million years ago during the Devonian Period, are at the northeastern tip of the Tolo channel. Various deformation and erosion features can be seen from these rocks. One of the famous features is the Devil's fist formed by weathering and erosion along the sandstone bedding forming the shape of the “Ghost fingers”.

Ma Shi Chau presents the sedimentary rocks formed about 280 million years ago. Various fossils such as ammonites, corals and bivalves were found on Ma Shi Chau. Sitting right next to the Tolo Channel fault system, various sheared features and folds can be observed.

Lai Chi Chong showcases various volcanic rocks and sedimentary rocks formed about 146 million years ago. The siltstone beds were interbedded with volcanic tuffite. Tuffite is a sedimentary rock with a volcanic origin. It formed by fine volcanic ash deposited in water, forming a sedimentary bed of volcanic ash. Other than that, there is also a black cherty mudstone on Lai Chi Chong, which is believed to be formed by mud deposited together with silica-rich materials. The black color indicated an oxygen depleted deposition environment. These black mudstones beds exhibits a slump fold structure. Large coherent mass of loosely consolidated materials might have slid down along a slope and folded the mudstone beds.

Tung Ping Chau
Tung Ping Chau sits in Mirs Bay in northeastern Hong Kong. It is the easternmost outlying island of Hong Kong. Tung Ping Chau is a popular holiday destination for locals. Its attractions, such as wave erosion landscape, the shale that resembles a sponge cake structure and the unusually flat lay of the island itself, draw thousands of visitors annually.

See also
 Geology of Hong Kong
 Conservation in Hong Kong
 Protected areas of China
 List of National Geoparks
 Lai Chi Wo

References

External links

 Hong Kong UNESCO Global Geopark website
 Proposal to set up a Geopark in Hong Kong, March 2009

 
Global Geoparks Network members
2009 establishments in Hong Kong